Exagistus is a genus of beetles in the family Buprestidae, containing the following species:

 Exagistus atroviridis Fisher, 1930
 Exagistus brunneus Fisher, 1930
 Exagistus embriki Obenberger, 1936
 Exagistus fossicollis Kerremans, 1906
 Exagistus igniceps Deyrolle, 1864
 Exagistus rossi Obenberger, 1936
 Exagistus strandi Obenberger, 1936

References

Buprestidae genera